The Suicide Club is a 1914 British silent drama film directed by Maurice Elvey and starring Montagu Love, Elisabeth Risdon, and Fred Groves. It was based on the 1878 short story cycle of the same name by Robert Louis Stevenson.

Partial cast
 Montagu Love as Prince Florizel
 Elisabeth Risdon as Zephyrine
 Fred Groves as President
 M. Gray Murray as Colonel Geraldine
 Frederick Culley as Captain Geraldine

References

External links

1914 films
1914 drama films
1910s English-language films
Films based on works by Robert Louis Stevenson
Films directed by Maurice Elvey
British silent feature films
British drama films
British black-and-white films
1910s British films
Silent drama films